The Senate Judiciary Subcommittee on the Constitution is one of eight subcommittees within the Senate Judiciary Committee.  The subcommittee was best known in the 1970s as the committee of Sam Ervin, whose investigations and lobbying — together with Frank Church and the Church Commission — led to the passage of the Foreign Intelligence Surveillance Act.

Jurisdiction
From the Senate Judiciary Committee website:
(1) Amendments to the United States Constitution
(2) Civil rights oversight
(3) Property rights
(4) Federal-state relations
(5) Individual rights
(6) Commemorative Congressional Resolutions
(7) Interstate compacts

Members, 118th Congress

Historical subcommittee rosters

117th Congress

116th Congress

See also
United States House Judiciary Subcommittee on the Constitution

External links
 Senate Judiciary Committee website, Subcommittee page
 Govtrack.us site on subcommittee

Judiciary Senate Constitution, Civil Rights and Property Rights